Jago Geerts (born 21 April 2000) is a Belgian professional motocross rider.

Achievements
At 12 March 2023 Geerts won 17 GP in the Motocross World Championship.

References

External links
 Jago Geerts at MXGP web site
 

Living people
2000 births
People from Geel
Belgian motocross riders
Sportspeople from Antwerp Province